Puncturella plecta is a species of sea snail, a marine gastropod mollusk in the family Fissurellidae, the keyhole limpets and slit limpets.

References

External links
 To Biodiversity Heritage Library (4 publications)
 To Encyclopedia of Life
 To ITIS
 To World Register of Marine Species

Fissurellidae
Gastropods described in 1883